Plicatol A is one of the three phenanthrenes that can be isolated from the stems of the orchid Dendrobium plicatile.

See also 
 Plicatol B
 Plicatol C

References

External links 
 Plicatol A at kanaya.naist.jp/knapsack_jsp

Phenanthrenoids